Annenberg may refer to:

 Annenberg (surname)
 The Annenberg Foundation, formerly Annenberg/CPB, known for funding educational television and the Annenberg Channel
 Annenberg School for Communication (disambiguation)
 The USC Annenberg School for Communication at the University of Southern California
 The Annenberg School for Communication at the University of Pennsylvania
 The Wallis Annenberg Center for the Performing Arts, a community arts center in Beverly Hills, California
 The Annenberg Institute at Brown University
 The Annenberg Public Policy Center at the University of Pennsylvania
 The Annenberg Center for Health Sciences at Eisenhower Medical Center
 The Annenberg Library at Pine Manor College
 Annenberg Hall, the freshman dining hall at Harvard College, part of Memorial Hall